The Calder Cup is the trophy awarded annually to the playoff champion of the American Hockey League (AHL). First awarded in the 1937–38 season, it is named after Frank Calder, first president of the National Hockey League. The Calder Cup is distinct from the Calder Memorial Trophy, which is awarded annually to the Rookie of the Year in the National Hockey League. 

Teams from 28 different cities have won the Calder Cup. The Hershey Bears have won 11 championships, the most of any team currently in the AHL, and have competed in 23 finals, the most of any team in AHL history, compiling an 11–12 record in the finals. Teams representing Cleveland, Ohio are second, with 10 total championships (nine by the Barons franchise, which competed in the league until 1973, and the city's current team - the Cleveland Monsters - winning the 10th in 2016.) 

On May 11, 2020, the AHL cancelled the remainder of the 2019–20 AHL season and the 2020 Calder Cup playoffs due to the COVID-19 pandemic, marking the first time that a Calder Cup champion was not awarded in the trophy's history. It was also not awarded in 2021 as the league did not hold a playoff (even though the AHL did play a delayed and shortened regular season).

The Most Valuable Player of the playoffs is awarded the Jack A. Butterfield Trophy. It was first awarded in 1984 and is named after the former president of the AHL, Jack Butterfield. The trophy has been won by 34 different players, with none having won it more than once.


List of winners

Key
–Number of Calder Cups won at the time
 Player was a member of the defeated team in the Calder Cup Finals

Note: All Jack A. Butterfield Trophy winners played for the winning team, unless otherwise noted.

A. Calder Cup won by second franchise known as the Pittsburgh Hornets. Previous franchise became the Rochester Americans.
B. Tim Tookey, Butterfield Trophy winner in 1985–86, played for the Hershey Bears, and is the only Butterfield Trophy winner to date to have played for a losing team in the Calder Cup finals.

Number of Calder Cups won by team
Bold denotes an active AHL team

References
General

 
 
 
 

Specific

External links
Official Calder Cup website

American Hockey League trophies and awards
Calder Cup champions